William James Moxham (21 April 1886 – 12 January 1959) was an Australian rules footballer who played with South Melbourne in the Victorian Football League (VFL).

Moxham appeared in two grand finals during his four-season league career, with the first coming in his debut season. South Melbourne lost on that occasion but he was a member of the team which won the 1909 premiership, playing as a wingman.

He later took up umpiring and was a VFL boundary umpire in 25 games from 1913 to 1919.

References

External links
 
 

1886 births
Sydney Swans players
Sydney Swans Premiership players
Australian Football League umpires
Australian rules footballers from Melbourne
1959 deaths
One-time VFL/AFL Premiership players